German Shanghai Metro Group was a joint venture between Shanghai Metro, Siemens AG and AEG (the railroad division now part of Bombardier Transportation) to develop railcars for the metro system.

The cars are designed in Germany and built in China.

References

Rolling stock manufacturers of China
Siemens
AEG